Gilbert Eliott  (1796 – 30 June 1871), was a politician in colonial Queensland and a Speaker of the Queensland Legislative Assembly.

Early life 
Eliot was third son of Sir William Eliott, the 6th Bart. of that name, of Stobs, Roxburghshire. He was born in 1796, and married, in 1830, Isabella Lucy, daughter of the Rev. Robert Eliott, vicar of Askham (who died in 1871).

Politics 
Eliott emigrated to Australia, and was appointed a police magistrate at Parramatta in June 1842. He became chief of the three commissioners of the city of Sydney in January 1842.

in July 1859 was elected to the New South Wales Legislative Assembly as the member for Burnett but had only served 5 months when the Colony of Queensland was created and his seat became redundant. He was then elected to the first Queensland Legislative Assembly in April 1860, as member for Wide Bay. On the meeting of the House in May he was elected the first Speaker, and, having been thrice successively re-elected in the next three Parliaments, voluntarily retired in Nov. 1870, when he was created C.M.G.

Later life 
Eliott died on 30 June 1871 and was buried in Drayton and Toowoomba Cemetery.

Eliott's eldest son, Gilbert William, was a police magistrate in Queensland from 1865 to 1878; and, by his marriage with Jane Penelope, daughter of Thomas Thomson, of Tasmania, had a son, Gilbert Francis Eliott, born in 1859, who was Engineer of Harbours and Rivers for Northern Queensland.

References

1796 births
1871 deaths
Members of the Queensland Legislative Assembly
Burials in Drayton and Toowoomba Cemetery
Speakers of the Queensland Legislative Assembly
Members of the New South Wales Legislative Assembly
Members of the Queensland Legislative Council
19th-century Australian politicians
19th-century Australian public servants